Today the term South Seas, or South Sea, is used in several contexts.  Most commonly it refers to the portion of the Pacific Ocean south of the equator. In 1513, when Spanish conquistador Vasco Núñez de Balboa coined the term Mar del Sur, or South Sea, the term was applied to the entire area of today's Pacific Ocean. In 1520 Ferdinand Magellan named the same ocean the Pacific Ocean, and over time Magellan's name became dominant.  The South Sea term was retained, but was applied only to southern areas of the Pacific.

The term South Sea may also be used synonymously for Oceania, or even more narrowly for Polynesia or the Polynesian Triangle, an area bounded by the Hawaiian Islands, New Zealand and Easter Island. Pacific Islanders are commonly referred to as South Sea Islanders, particularly in Australia.

Origin 

The Spanish conquistador Vasco Núñez de Balboa coined the term "South Sea" when he traveled across the Isthmus of Panama and reached the Bay of San Miguel, naming the ocean ahead Mar del Sur ("South Sea") due to its location along the southern shore of the isthmus.

Núñez de Balboa and his soldiers tried to travel to the peak of the mountain to see the huge sea, but when they arrived at the foot of the mountain there were only 69 out of 190 soldiers left. He did not want to share the experience of being the first to see the unknown ocean and so he commanded his crew to stand still and wait. On 25 September 1513, he was the first European to see the Pacific Ocean. After looking at the ocean for some time, he told his crew to come up to join him.

After he set foot into the ocean, at the opening of the Saban river, he declared the South Sea, and all adjoining lands to be property of his king.

South Seas paradise 
In a figurative sense, the South Seas is an often idealized and distant region. An entire genre of literature and film has developed around the romance of the region.

In 1773, when James Cook came to Tahiti for the second time, he was accompanied by two scientifically educated Germans Johann Reinhold Forster and Georg Forster.
"What a morning—impossible to be described more beautifully by any poet—when we saw the isle O-Taheiti two miles ahead of us."

The report of the discoverers determined the Europeans' picture of the South Seas for a long time. On those grounds, Joseph Banks wrote: 
"An Arcadia of which we will be king."

Louis Antoine de Bougainville's romantic travel report Voyage autour du monde and Georg Forster's travel description A Voyage Round the World (1777) confirmed Jean-Jacques Rousseau's image of the "noble savages". He describes the country as "jardin d’Eden" (Garden of Eden), which provided his residents with everything required to live. He saw the islanders as pure humans who were not yet poisoned by civilization. The report Voyage autour du monde inspired Denis Diderot to write his essay Supplément au voyage de Bougainville, a plea for sexual freedom.

Paul Gauguin, a French artist, contributed to that picture as well. His pictures do not resemble reality but rather the exotic paradise that he envisioned.

Even the German writer Erich Scheurmann benefited from this imagery, which he used in his fictional travel reports of a South Seas chief that were published between 1915 and 1920 under the title The Papalagi. Fifty years after the book was published, it became a cult book and more than 1.7 million copies were sold in the German language alone.

The South Seas in painting 
Joseph Banks hired Sydney Parkinson as a nature draftsman and the landscape painter  Alexander Buchan to accompany James Cook's first expedition to the Pacific (1768 –1771) and to record the discoveries. They depicted the people living on the Society Islands, on the coasts of New Zealand and on Easter Island and their habitat in drawings and paintings. The painter William Hodges accompanied Captain Cook on his second expedition to the South Seas, to New Zealand, Tonga, to the Society Islands, to Melanesia, among others and to Easter Island. During Cook's third expedition to the South Seas, John Webber painted South Sea motifs on the Cook Islands, Tahiti and Hawaii, among other places.

Paul Gauguin, reached Tahiti in April 1891, painted 66 paintings there, left the island due to health problems and brief difficulties in early 1892 and returned from Paris to Papeete in September 1895. He died in 1903 on the Marquesas. With his South Sea pictures Gauguin was a pioneer of Expressionism. Emil Nolde took part in an expedition (Medical-Demographic German New Guinea Expedition) to Papua New Guinea (then German New Guinea) in 1913/14. Max Pechstein lived from May 1914 until the outbreak of the  First World War on the  Micronesian  Palau Islands. Henri Matisse visited Tahiti in 1931. In 1988 Per Kirkeby traveled to Polynesia and New Zealand. Ingo Kühl painted in 2001/2002 on the Cook Islands, in French Polynesia, Fiji and Vanuatu, followed by working stays in Papua New Guinea for example on the Trobriand Islands (2012).

Application of the term 
The South Seas Mandate was the name of the Japanese mandate over certain islands following World War I.

The "South Seas trade" was a term used in Britain in the nineteenth century to denote sealing, whaling, island trading and other commercial ship-based activities in the Pacific.

See also
 South Sea (disambiguation)

References

Oceania
Pacific Ocean